Oxytelus laqueatus is a species of spiny-legged rove beetle in the family Staphylinidae. It is found in Africa, Europe and Northern Asia (excluding China), Central America, North America, South America, and Southern Asia.

References

Further reading

 

Oxytelinae
Articles created by Qbugbot
Beetles described in 1802